is a railway station  in the town of Tsubata, Kahoku District, Ishikawa, Japan, jointly operated by the third-sector railway operator IR Ishikawa Railway and the Ainokaze Toyama Railway.

Lines

Layout

The station has an island platform serving two tracks. The platform is connected to the station building on the south side by a footbridge. The station is unattended.

Platforms

Adjacent stations

History
Kurikara Station opened on 15 June 1909. With the privatization of JNR on 1 April 1987, the station came under the control of JR West.

From this date, Kurikara Station became a boundary station between the Ainokaze Toyama Railway Line of Toyama Prefecture to the west and the IR Ishikawa Railway Line of Ishikawa Prefecture to the east.

Surrounding area
Kariyasu Elementary School

See also
 List of railway stations in Japan

References

External links

 

Railway stations in Ishikawa Prefecture
Railway stations in Japan opened in 1909
IR Ishikawa Railway Line
Ainokaze Toyama Railway Line
Tsubata, Ishikawa